"Firestone" is a song by Norwegian DJ and record producer Kygo, featuring vocals from Australian singer Conrad Sewell. It was released on 1 December 2014 and reached number one on the Norwegian Singles Chart and became a big international hit for Kygo on many other charts. Birdy performed a cover of the song on BBC Radio 1's Live Lounge.

Music video
The music video was released on Kygo's official Vevo channel on 9 March 2015, where it had gained over 750 million views as of January 2021. The video starts with a young woman (played by Rachel Echelberger, contestant of America's Next Top Model cycle 13) bumping into a guy, who pulls him in and seems about to kiss him before walking off with a suggestive display. He is entranced and follows her through a series of doors that open up into different scenes, such as a forest, parties (where Kygo is seen playing music), a pool, and the dry riverbed in Los Angeles. They briefly reconnect at one of the parties before she leaves again. As he steps up the chase, she continues running, and when he appears to have lost her for good, he loses his temper. However, after he sees her walking casually by in a rugged warehouse loft, the chase continues. At the end of the video, he ends up at the same location where they first met, but on exiting the next door, he finds her standing alone on a building rooftop in the city, where he meets her as the video fades.

Track listing

Charts

Weekly charts

Special acoustic release featuring Conrad Sewell

Year-end charts

Certifications

Release history

References

2014 singles
2014 songs
Conrad Sewell songs
Kygo songs
Song recordings produced by Kygo
Number-one singles in Norway
Number-one singles in Poland
Songs written by Kygo
Songs written by Conrad Sewell
Ultra Music singles